The Corno di Gesero is a mountain of the Lepontine Alps, located on the border between the Swiss cantons of Ticino and Graubünden. It lies on the range west of the Cima di Cugn, between the Valle d'Arbedo and the Val Traversagna.

References

External links
 Corno di Gesero on Hikr

Mountains of the Alps
Mountains of Graubünden
Mountains of Ticino
Graubünden–Ticino border
Lepontine Alps
Mountains of Switzerland
Two-thousanders of Switzerland